The 1992 Sacramento State Hornets football team represented California State University, Sacramento as a member of the Western Football Conference (WFC) during the 1992 NCAA Division II football season. Led by Bob Mattos in his 15th and final season as head coach, Sacramento State compiled an overall record of 7–3 with a mark of 3–2 in conference play, tying for second place in the WFC. The team outscored its opponents 268 to 149 for the season. The Hornets played home games at Hornet Stadium in Sacramento, California.

Schedule

Team players in the NFL
The following Sacramento State players were selected in the 1993 NFL Draft.

References

Sacramento State
Sacramento State Hornets football seasons
Sacramento State Hornets football